Bethel Township may refer to:

 Bethel Township, McDonough County, Illinois
 Bethel Township, Posey County, Indiana
 Bethel Township, Fayette County, Iowa
 Bethel Township, Michigan
 Bethel Township, Clark County, Ohio
 Bethel Township, Miami County, Ohio
 Bethel Township, Monroe County, Ohio
 Bethel Township, Armstrong County, Pennsylvania
 Bethel Township, Berks County, Pennsylvania
 Bethel Township, Delaware County, Pennsylvania
 Bethel Township, Fulton County, Pennsylvania
 Bethel Township, Lebanon County, Pennsylvania

Township name disambiguation pages